Gov't Mule is the self-titled debut studio album by southern rock jam band Gov't Mule. The album was produced and mostly recorded live by Michael Barbiero at Bearsville Sound Studios with many tracks running into each other. "Mule" is still a concert favorite, and "Rockin' Horse" was later recorded by The Allman Brothers Band when Warren Haynes rejoined the group for the album Hittin' the Note.

Track listing

Personnel
Warren Haynes - vocals, guitar
Matt Abts - drums
Allen Woody - bass
John Popper - harmonica
Hook Herrera - harmonica
Michael Barbiero - production

References

1995 debut albums
Gov't Mule albums
Relativity Records albums